Vincent Vaughan (17 July 1888 – 30 November 1954) was an Irish Gaelic footballer. His championship career at senior level with the Tipperary county team spanned fourteen years from 1911 to 1925.

Vaughan made his debut on the inter-county scene at the age of twenty-one when he was selected for the Tipperary junior team in 1910. He enjoyed several championship seasons with the junior team, culminating with the winning of All-Ireland medals in 1912 and 1923. By this time Vaughan had also joined the Tipperary senior team, making his debut during the 1911 championship. The highlight of his inter-county career came in 1920 when he won an All-Ireland medal. Vaughan also won two Munster medals.

Honours
Mullinahone
Tipperary Senior Football Championship (3): 1912, 1913, 1916

Tipperary
All-Ireland Senior Football Championship (1): 1920
Munster Senior Football Championship (2): 1920, 1922, 
All-Ireland Junior Football Championship (1): 1912, 1923
Munster Junior Football Championship (1): 1912

References

1888 births
1954 deaths
Arravale Rovers Gaelic footballers
20th-century Irish farmers
Mullinahone Gaelic footballers
Tipperary inter-county Gaelic footballers
Winners of one All-Ireland medal (Gaelic football)